This is a list of allies of James Bond who appear throughout the film series and novels.

MI6

M 

M is a Rear Admiral of the Royal Navy, and the head of the Secret Intelligence Service. Fleming based the character on a number of people he knew who commanded sections of British intelligence. M has appeared in the novels by Fleming and seven continuation authors, as well as 24 films. M has been portrayed by Bernard Lee, Robert Brown, Judi Dench, Ralph Fiennes, John Huston and Edward Fox.

Miss Moneypenny 

Miss Moneypenny is the secretary to M. The films depict her as having a reserved romantic interest in Bond, although Fleming's novels do not imply such a relationship while the John Gardner and Raymond Benson novels emphasise it more. In the film series, Moneypenny has been portrayed by Lois Maxwell, Barbara Bouchet, Pamela Salem, Caroline Bliss, Samantha Bond and Naomie Harris.

Q 

Q (standing for Quartermaster) is the head of Q Branch (or later Q Division), the fictional research and development division of the British Secret Service. His real name is Major Boothroyd, but Bond and M never use his name. He has appeared in 20 of 23 Eon Bond films; all except Live and Let Die, Casino Royale and Quantum of Solace. The character was also featured in the non-Eon Bond films Casino Royale (1967) and Never Say Never Again. He has been portrayed by Desmond Llewelyn for most of the films, and by Peter Burton, Geoffrey Bayldon,  Alec McCowen,  John Cleese (first as R in The World Is Not Enough), and Ben Whishaw.

Bill Tanner 

Bill Tanner is MI6's Chief of Staff.  Tanner is a Bond ally appearing regularly in the novels of Ian Fleming and John Gardner, as well as in Kingsley Amis' Colonel Sun, but did not become a regular cinematic character until the Brosnan and Craig era of films.  Among his most prominent cinematic roles was in For Your Eyes Only (1981), in which Tanner was given a bigger part while M was "on leave", due to Bernard Lee's death that prevented him from reprising his role as M in the film. He otherwise has minor roles in The Man with the Golden Gun (1974), and appears in two of the four Brosnan films. Tanner appears in four of the five Craig films, taking on an increased role as M's chief aide and a friend and ally of Bond.

In 1965, Amis wrote the authorised spin-off The Book of Bond, or Every Man His Own 007, a tongue-in-cheek guide to being a spy.  The book is not credited to Amis, but rather to Lt. Col. William "Bill" Tanner.
 Michael Goodliffe (1974) (uncredited)
 James Villiers (1981)
 Michael Kitchen (1995–1999)
 Rory Kinnear (2008–present)

Mary Goodnight 
Mary Goodnight is Bond's second personal secretary.  She first appears in the novel On Her Majesty's Secret Service, then again in You Only Live Twice.  By the time of her appearance in The Man with the Golden Gun, she has been assigned to the Kingston station of the service, although she has a much larger role.  She appears later in the Jeffery Deaver novel Carte Blanche. She is shown to have a strong friendship with Miss Moneypenny.

She appears in the film The Man with the Golden Gun as a Bond girl, played by Britt Ekland.

Loelia Ponsonby 
Loelia Ponsonby is Bond's shared personal secretary in many of the Bond novels.  She is also the secretary for 008 and 0011, both of whom share an office with Bond.  She retires and is replaced in On Her Majesty's Secret Service by Mary Goodnight after she marries a member of the Baltic Exchange.  For the films, her flirtatious relationship with Bond is transferred to and replaced by Miss Moneypenny. Ponsonby nearly made an appearance in GoldenEye, but she was removed from the final draft.  The name of the character may be based on the Duchess of Westminster of the same name.

Charles Robinson 
Charles Robinson is the Deputy Chief of Staff at MI6 in the Pierce Brosnan Bond films.  He first appears in Tomorrow Never Dies, then later in The World Is Not Enough, and Die Another Day.  Played by Colin Salmon, Robinson appears to be M's right-hand man and is often seen at her side.  When Bond reports in with MI6, he often does so to Robinson.

Smithers 
One of Q's assistants, Smithers makes two film appearances: in For Your Eyes Only and Octopussy.  He is played by Jeremy Bulloch. He is a distinct character from Colonel Smithers, a Bank of England official whom Bond consults in the novel Goldfinger and its film version.

00 agents 

The 00 Section of MI6 is considered the elite of the Secret Service.  Agents with the 00 prefix have proven themselves capable enough in the field to be entrusted with the licence to kill:  the authorisation to, at their own discretion, commit acts of assassination and other controversial activities in order to complete their missions, without having to first seek permission from headquarters.

The following 00 agents have been referenced onscreen in the James Bond films.  Additional 00 agents, ranging from 001 to 0012, have been referenced in literature and in comic strips.
 002 – Mentioned in The Man with the Golden Gun, named Bill Fairbanks and killed by Francisco Scaramanga.  A different 002 (name not revealed) appears during the opening sequence of The Living Daylights.
 003 – Body found in a snowbank at the start of A View to a Kill.
 004 – Killed during the opening sequence of The Living Daylights.
 005 – Seen attending a meeting during Thunderball.
 006 – Named Alec Trevelyan, a one-time ally and friend of Bond who is presumed dead for nine years; he is the primary antagonist in GoldenEye.
 007 – Can refer to both James Bond and Nomi, MI6 agent holder of the codename in No Time to Die.
 008 – Mentioned by M in Goldfinger as a potential replacement for Bond if his mission fails.  Bond also mentions this to Goldfinger himself.  008 is also mentioned in The Living Daylights as an alternate choice to assassinate General Pushkin if Bond refuses to do so.
 009 – Seen early in Octopussy, killed by twins working for General Orlov.  However, 009 still manages to complete his mission by returning a forged Fabergé egg and Bond later avenges his death.  009 is also mentioned in the film The World Is Not Enough as the agent who initially shoots Renard. 009 is mentioned again in Spectre as the intended recipient of the Aston Martin DB10 after it was reassigned from Bond. Bond steals the car for use in his own mission, leaving 009 without it.

Additional unidentified 00 agents are seen briefly in Thunderball and The World Is Not Enough. In the latter, one of the agents is revealed to be female.

Recurring allies

Felix Leiter 

 Jack Lord (1962)
 Cec Linder (1964)
 Rik Van Nutter (1965)
 Norman Burton (1971)
 David Hedison (1973 & 1989)
 Bernie Casey (1983)
 John Terry (1987)
 Jeffrey Wright (2006, 2008 & 2021)

A revised version of the character of Felix Leiter appears in the 1954 television adaptation of Casino Royale.  In that version, Leiter is a British agent named Clarence Leiter and is played by Michael Pate.

General Anatoly Gogol 
General Anatoly Gogol is the head of the KGB in the films The Spy Who Loved Me, Moonraker, For Your Eyes Only, Octopussy, and A View to a Kill. In his final appearance, in The Living Daylights, the character has become a post-Glasnost envoy in the Foreign Service and is succeeded as head of the KGB by General Pushkin. In the end credits of the film, his first name is listed as "Anatol", although in The Spy Who Loved Me, M referred to him as Alexis. 

Gogol is played by Walter Gotell (who also played SPECTRE henchman Morzeny in From Russia with Love). With the KGB, Gogol often allies himself with Bond to stave off the possibility of war with the West, an ideal that is not always shared with his comrades—such as when he argues against Soviet General Orlov's reckless proposal of military conquest in Octopussy. Only in For Your Eyes Only and A View to a Kill does Gogol act as an enemy, but even then his actions are more those of a respectful competitor. He particularly opposes the methods of the villain Max Zorin in A View to a Kill. General Gogol has a secretary named Miss Rublevitch, played by Eva Rueber-Staier, being some sort of Soviet counterpart to Miss Moneypenny.

Sir Frederick Gray  
Sir Frederick Gray is the Minister of Defence in the films The Spy Who Loved Me, Moonraker, For Your Eyes Only, Octopussy, A View to a Kill, and The Living Daylights.  He is always listed in the closing credits as "Minister of Defence", and is played by Geoffrey Keen. 

In The Spy Who Loved Me, after being briefed on his forthcoming mission to Egypt, Bond holds a private discussion with Gray, to whom he refers as "Freddie". It is never revealed how they know each other well enough for Bond to be so informal. In the next few films, Bond calls Gray "Minister", for most of their scenes include other officials. It is also suggested that he belongs to no particular political party; direct references are made to Margaret Thatcher in For Your Eyes Only, even though he had also held the post in The Spy Who Loved Me and Moonraker – which were both made during the government led by James Callaghan.

Marc-Ange Draco 
Draco is the head of the Unione Corse, a (real-life) major European crime syndicate and a rival of SPECTRE. He appears in the novels On Her Majesty's Secret Service, working as an ally of Bond; and Never Dream of Dying, where 007's former father-in-law turns out to be linked to the villain of the Union. He also appears in the film On Her Majesty's Secret Service, portrayed by Gabriele Ferzetti.

René Mathis 
Mathis is a long-time friend of Bond and an agent of the French secret service Service de Documentation Extérieure et de Contre-Espionnage (SDECE). He is a main character in Casino Royale and a supporting character in From Russia, with Love, Never Dream of Dying and Devil May Care. Mathis captures the SMERSH villain Rosa Klebb, and uses cardiopulmonary resuscitation to keep Bond alive until a doctor arrives after Bond is poisoned by Klebb. In Casino Royale, it is revealed that he originally met Bond on assignment in Monte Carlo prior to World War II, when Bond was trying to crack down on a group of Romanians cheating at a local casino with the use of invisible ink. Mathis is reassigned to work with Bond at the time of the events in Casino Royale, where he poses as a radio salesman, assisting Bond and introducing him to Vesper Lynd.

In the novel Thunderball, Bill Tanner asks Moneypenny to send a copy of SPECTRE's ransom demand letter to Mathis at the Deuxième Bureau. In Never Dream of Dying, he is captured by the head of the Union Le Gérant and is blinded with lasers. Bond later saves him from imprisonment. A younger version of Mathis appears in the "Young Bond" short story "A Hard Man to Kill".

The characters of Mathis and Vesper Lynd are combined to form Valerie Mathis in the original 1954 Climax! production of "Casino Royale". Mathis first appears onscreen in the 1967 version of Casino Royale, played by Duncan Macrae. Here, he is a police officer, prompting Evelyn Tremble (Peter Sellers) to state that it has been worrying him that despite his supposed nationality, Mathis has a Scots accent: "Aye, it worries me too", Mathis replies. In the 2006 adaptation of Casino Royale, Mathis is an MI6 agent, played by Giancarlo Giannini. Mathis is suspected of being a traitor and informant to Le Chiffre and arrested. Upon the discovery that Vesper was the real traitor, Bond advises that MI6 should continue interrogating Mathis because his innocence has not yet been established. Mathis appears again in Quantum of Solace, having retired to an Italian villa given to him by MI6. He joins Bond to bring down Dominic Greene, only to be killed by corrupt policemen working for Greene. Before dying, Mathis asks Bond to forgive Vesper and make peace with her death.

May Maxwell 
May Maxwell is Bond's loyal and elderly Scottish housekeeper, who is often mentioned in Ian Fleming's Bond novels.  She also appears in several John Gardner novels and the Anthony Horowitz novel Trigger Mortis, as well making a cameo appearance in the first Young James Bond novel, SilverFin.  She has yet to make an appearance in any of the Bond films.  May is named after the housekeeper of Ivar Bryce, a friend of Fleming.

Sir James Molony 
A noted neurologist whose expertise is frequently employed by M and the Secret Services, Molony appears in the novels Dr No, Thunderball, You Only Live Twice, and The Man with the Golden Gun.

Sheriff J.W. Pepper 
Sheriff John Wayne (J.W.) Pepper is a parish sheriff in Louisiana. He appears in the films Live and Let Die and The Man with the Golden Gun. Played by Clifton James, he is mostly used as comic relief, especially and memorably for his racist (mainly against African Americans and Asians) and bigoted
attitudes and his tendency to speak loudly about whatever is on his mind. 

In Live and Let Die, he chases Bond's and Kananga's speedboats, believing them to be young people joyriding, but Felix Leiter later has one of the sheriff's superiors introducing him to Bond's mission. His first film appearance also reveals a comedic rivalry with Louisiana State Police troopers, who are shown kidding him when his car is destroyed by a fallen speedboat of Kananga's.  After a chase that destroys several police cars, the state police tell him that Bond is a spy and Pepper quips, "On whose side?" 

In The Man with the Golden Gun, a vacationing Pepper is shown having a boat tour in Thailand and briefly seeing Bond on another boat (the spectator can hear the notes of the preceding film's main theme where its title is made to better identify Pepper and his relation with Bond's adventures). Later, a gag involving him and an elephant is represented on the screen. He is later the man trying the AMC Hornet that Bond steals from a showroom, and, convinced of being chasing Communists (another category he dislikes), "helps" Bond in the subsequent car chase with Francisco Scaramanga's AMC Matador, only to be arrested by the Royal Thai Police together with the British operative.

Both of Pepper's appearances, particularly in the latter film, have been criticised by some Bond fans who view him as symptomatic of the overly comic and slapstick nature of some of the 'Moore Era' movies. Despite this, Pepper does have a loyal following amongst some Bond fans, with Roger Moore claiming “He gave my first two films a great, fun character." on actor Clifton James’s death.

Quarrel 
Quarrel is a Cayman Islander living in Jamaica. He first appears in the novel Live and Let Die as Bond's guide while 007 is investigating Mr. Big. Quarrel later appears in the novel Dr. No to help Bond infiltrate Dr. Julius No's island, Crab Key. The only Bond film in which Quarrel appears is the 1962 film Dr. No, played by John Kitzmiller where, as in the novel, he is killed by Dr. No's mythical "dragon", which is actually a flamethrower-equipped vehicle.

For the film adaptation of Live and Let Die, Bond teams up with Quarrel's (presumed) son, Quarrel Jr., played by Roy Stewart, who leads him on his boat in multiple scenes, before helping him destroy Dr. Kananga's poppy fields. Curiously, Quarrel Jr. seems to have a great knowledge of the island of San Monique, despite presumably being a Cayman Islander.

John Strangways and Mary Trueblood 
John Strangways is a former Lieutenant Commander in the special branch of the Royal Naval Volunteer Reserve.  He makes his first appearance in the novel Live and Let Die as the chief Secret Service agent in the Caribbean. Strangways is roughly 35 years old and wears a black patch over one eye. He later appears in the novel Dr. No, where he and his Number 2, Mary Trueblood (a former Chief Officer in the Women's Royal Naval Service), are assassinated for prying into Dr. Julius No's business. Mary Trueblood is based on Fleming's secretary from The Sunday Times, Una Trueblood.

Strangways makes his only appearance in the films in Dr. No, where, as in the novel, he is killed for investigating the title character. Unlike in the novel, however, Strangways does not wear an eyepatch in the film. He is portrayed by Timothy Moxon and voiced by Robert Rietty (who later voiced villains Emilio Largo in Thunderball and Ernst Stavro Blofeld in For Your Eyes Only). Mary is portrayed by Dolores Keator and dubbed by Nikki van der Zyl; both were Jamaican residents and were not in London for the final dubbing of the film.

Tiger Tanaka 

Tiger Tanaka is an ally to Bond in the novel You Only Live Twice and its film adaptation. He is the head of the Japanese Secret Service (Koan-Chosa-Kyoku) and resides within a secret underground office complex beneath the streets of Tokyo, his identity being the most closely guarded secret in Japan. Tanaka helps Bond disguise himself to look Japanese so that Blofeld will not recognise him. Tanaka arranges for Bond to marry a girl native to the land, Kissy Suzuki, in order to provide extra cover. In the film, Tanaka is portrayed by Tetsurō Tamba. He supplies an army of ninjas to attack Ernst Stavro Blofeld and leads the attack on Blofeld's volcano base. Tanaka also appears in the novel The Man with the Red Tattoo and in the Dynamite Entertainment-published spin-off comic book, Felix Leiter.

In the novel, the character was based on one of Fleming's friends, Torao Saito — although he was not connected to Japanese intelligence, but was in fact a well-known polymath in Japan, being a journalist, writer, photographer and architect.

Ronnie Vallance 
Vallance appears in four of the Bond novels:  Moonraker, Diamonds Are Forever, Colonel Sun and On Her Majesty's Secret Service, as well as two of the short stories: "The Property of a Lady" and "Risico".  He is the head of Special Branch, with the Metropolitan Police rank of Assistant Commissioner, and the boss of Gala Brand.

Jack Wade 
Jack Wade is an American CIA agent who appears in the films GoldenEye and Tomorrow Never Dies.  He is played by Joe Don Baker. Eight years before GoldenEye, Baker played villain Brad Whitaker in The Living Daylights.

Valentin Dmitrovich Zukovsky  
Valentin Dmitrovich Zukovsky (Russian: Вaлeнтин Дмитриeвич Жуковский) is a former KGB agent turned Russian mafia head who runs a bar, a casino, and a caviar factory. When he was younger (and a KGB agent), a conflict with Bond ended with Bond shooting Zukovsky in the leg, causing him to walk with a limp. However, after leaving the KGB, Zukovsky does not hold a grudge towards Bond, especially when dealing with Bond means turning a profit. Played by Robbie Coltrane, Zukovsky makes two appearances in the films, his first being in GoldenEye before being shot and mortally wounded by Elektra King in The World Is Not Enough. He lives long enough after being shot to execute a trick shot using his cane gun, enabling Bond to escape King's trap.

Dr. Madeleine Swann 

Dr. Madeleine Swann is a psychiatrist, daughter of Mr. White, who assists Bond in his mission and becomes his love interest in the film Spectre and continues to be a central character in the subsequent film No Time to Die.

Film allies  
This section lists allies who each appear in only one film.

(*) Robert Brown also played 'M' in Octopussy, A View To A Kill, The Living Daylights and Licence To Kill. As M's real name and background are not revealed in any of these films, it is possible Brown's 'M' may in fact be Hargreaves.

Additional allies 
Thunderball:
 Major François Derval (played by Paul Stassino)
 Foreign Secretary (played by Roland Culver)
 Sir John (played by Edward Underdown)
 Kenniston (played by Reginald Beckwith)
 Ladislav Kutze (played by George Pravda)
 Group Captain Pritchard (played by Leonard Sachs)

Casino Royale (1967 version):
 Mata Bond (played by Joanna Pettet)
 Sir James Bond's Butler (played by Erik Chitty)
 Captain Carlton-Towers (played by Bernard Cribbins)
 Chinese General (played by Burt Kwouk)
 Cooper (played by Terence Cooper)
 "The Detainer" (played by Daliah Lavi)
 French Legionnaire (played by Jean-Paul Belmondo)
 Le Grand (played by Charles Boyer)
 Agent Mimi/Lady Fiona McTarry (played by Deborah Kerr)
 Ransome (played by William Holden)
 Mr. Slymington-Jones (played by Colin Gordon)
 Smernov (played by Kurt Kasznar)
 Evelyn Tremble (played by Peter Sellers)

Never Say Never Again:
 Nigel Small-Fawcett (played by Rowan Atkinson)
 Lord Ambrose (played by Anthony Sharp)
 Gen. Miler (played by Manning Redwood)
 Nicole (played by Saskia Cohen-Tanugi)
 Capt. Pederson (played by Billy J. Mitchell)

See also 
 Outline of James Bond

References

External links 
 James Bond multimedia | Bond allies

Allies
Lists of actors by role
Lists of minor fictional characters
Lists of fictional sidekicks